Paavo Juhani Mikkonen (born 25 January 1942) is a Finnish former sports shooter. He competed in the 50 metre running target event at the 1972 Summer Olympics.

References

External links
 

1942 births
Living people
People from Valkeala
Finnish male sport shooters
Olympic shooters of Finland
Shooters at the 1972 Summer Olympics
Sportspeople from Kymenlaakso